Jamar Love (born November 8, 1986) is an American football cornerback who is currently a free agent. He was signed by the New England Patriots as an undrafted free agent in 2009. He played college football at Arkansas.

Love has also been a member of the Dallas Cowboys, Tampa Bay Buccaneers and Tennessee Titans. Love has been an All-IFL selection in his career.

References

External links
Arkansas Razorbacks bio
New England Patriots bio
Tampa Bay Buccaneers bio
Tennessee Titans bio

1986 births
Living people
People from North Little Rock, Arkansas
Players of American football from Arkansas
American football cornerbacks
Arkansas Razorbacks football players
New England Patriots players
Dallas Cowboys players
Saskatchewan Roughriders players
Tampa Bay Buccaneers players
Tennessee Titans players
Milwaukee Mustangs (2009–2012) players
Tampa Bay Storm players
Cleveland Gladiators players
Nebraska Danger players